Schöpfl is the highest hill (893 m) in the Wienerwald mountain range (Vienna woods), the north-easternmost part of the Alps. Geologically, it belongs to the flysch Alps.

The main top of the wooded mountain range carries a high observation tower which enables a 100 km sight to the Northern Limestone Alps in the west and the Carpathian Mountains in the east.

At the Mitterschöpfl (approx. 882 m above sea level), the University of Vienna's Leopold Figl observatory is located. Its largest instrument is a telescope with a primary mirror of 1.5 m which was constructed in the 1960s. A second tower was built recently for some smaller astrophysical telescopes.

External links 

Astronomical Institute, Univ.Vienna

Mountains of Lower Austria
Mountains of the Alps